"Just for One Night" is a song by English duo Blonde, featuring Norwegian singer-songwriter Astrid S. It was released to digital retailers on 16 June 2017, through Parlophone Records and FFRR Records.

Background
"As soon as we had the idea for this song we knew that Astrid would be perfect for it," the duo told Clash magazine. "We had been fans of her music for ages and really wanted to do a record with her! When her vocal takes landed in my inbox from LA I was screaming!"

Critical reception
Robin Murray of Clash magazine said: "'Just For One Night' could dominate the summer, the latest in a series of singles that bridge the gap between the underground and the charts. It's the sort of thing summer was invented for – production bedlam meets that coy vocal, it's a delicious, infectious pop music." Mike Wass of Idolator said: "Norwegian goddess Astrid S lends her icy vocals to Blonde's 'Just for One Night,' creating brittle dance-pop magic." Dance Vici regarded the song as "a smooth and arguably revitalised production that features the soothing vocals of the hugely talented Astrid S" and "embodies a newly stimulated direction in Blonde's sound and further demonstrates the natural evolution and international diversification the boys can produce."

Track listing

Release history

References

2017 singles
2017 songs
Blonde (duo) songs
Astrid S songs
Parlophone singles
FFRR Records singles
Songs written by Jeremy Chacon
Songs written by Raye (singer)
Songs written by Jacob Manson